Rosenhof is a hamlet in Coulee Rural Municipality No. 136, Saskatchewan, Canada. The hamlet is located on Range Rd. 123 4 km south of Highway 363, about 15 km south of Swift Current.

Demographics

In 2010, Rosenhof had a population of 57 living in 20 dwellings. It was founded as a Mennonite settlement, but has seen an influx of other backgrounds in recent years.

See also

 List of communities in Saskatchewan
 Hamlets of Saskatchewan

References

Unincorporated communities in Saskatchewan
Coulee No. 136, Saskatchewan